A. Timmasagar is a village in the southern state of Karnataka, India. It is located in the Hubli taluk of Dharwad district in Karnataka.

Demographics
As of the 2011 Census of India there were 205 households in A. Timmasagar and a total population of 850 consisting of 445 males and 405 females. There were 108 children ages 0–6.

See also
 Dharwad
 Districts of Karnataka

References

External links
  Government of India website list showing A. Timmasagar

Villages in Dharwad district